Turbo canaliculatus, common name the channeled turban, is a species of large sea snail, a marine gastropod mollusk in the family Turbinidae, the turban snails.

Distribution
The distribution of Turbo canaliculatus includes the Caribbean Sea, Cuba, the Gulf of Mexico, Jamaica, the Lesser Antilles, Mexico and Puerto Rico.; in the Atlantic Ocean off Brazil.

Description 
The maximum recorded shell length is 98 mm.

The sutures show a deep, smooth channel. The body whorl contains 16-18 strong, spiral cords. The glossy shell has a narrow umbilicus and a white aperture. The operculum is pale brown on the inside and white and convex on the outside.

Habitat 
The minimum recorded depth is 2 m. The maximum recorded depth is 300 m.

See also 
 Turbo canaliculatus Gmelin, 1791 (note that this name has a different authority) is a synonym of Turbo argyrostomus argyrostomus Linnaeus, 1758.

References

 Hermann, J. 1781. Erster Brief über einiger Conchylien an den Herausgeber. Der Naturforscher 16: 50-56, pl. 2
 Gmelin, J. F. 1791. Systema naturae per regna tria naturae. Editio decima tertia. Systema Naturae, 13th ed., vol. 1(6): 3021-3910. Lipsiae
 Schumacher, C. F. 1817. Essai d'un Nouveau Système des Habitations des Vers Testacés.  [iv] + 287 pp., 22 pls. Schultz: Copenhague.
 Turgeon, D.D., et al. 1998. Common and scientific names of aquatic invertebrates of the United States and Canada. American Fisheries Society Special Publication 26 page(s): 60
 Alf A. & Kreipl K. (2003). A Conchological Iconography: The Family Turbinidae, Subfamily Turbininae, Genus Turbo. Conchbooks, Hackenheim Germany.
 Williams, S.T. (2007). Origins and diversification of Indo-West Pacific marine fauna: evolutionary history and biogeography of turban shells (Gastropoda, Turbinidae). Biological Journal of the Linnean Society, 2007, 92, 573–592.
 Rosenberg, G., F. Moretzsohn, and E. F. García. 2009. Gastropoda (Mollusca) of the Gulf of Mexico, Pp. 579–699 in Felder, D.L. and D.K. Camp (eds.), Gulf of Mexico–Origins, Waters, and Biota. Biodiversity. Texas A&M Press, College Station, Texas.

External links
 

canaliculatus
Taxa named by Johann Hermann
Molluscs described in 1781